Thomas Clarkson (April 1865 – 1915) was an English footballer who played in the Football League for Aston Villa.

References

1865 births
1915 deaths
English footballers
Association football midfielders
English Football League players
Halesowen Town F.C. players
Aston Villa F.C. players